Sony Pictures Home Entertainment (abbreviated as SPHE) is the home video distribution division of Sony Pictures Entertainment, a subsidiary of Sony Group Corporation.

Background
SPHE is responsible for the distribution of the Sony Pictures library for home entertainment, mainly releases from the Sony Pictures Motion Picture Group (Columbia Pictures, TriStar Pictures, Sony Pictures Classics, and Screen Gems) as well as releases from Sony Pictures Worldwide Acquisitions (Triumph Films, Destination Films, Stage 6 Films and Affirm Films). SPHE also releases and distributes products from Revolution Studios and The Criterion Collection. Since June 20, 2007, SPHE has handled distribution of children's content formerly handled by Sony BMG's Sony Wonder label.

SPHE is also responsible for distribution of television shows from the Sony Pictures Television library, including those produced by Screen Gems, Columbia Pictures Television, TriStar Television, Tandem Productions, TOY Productions, ELP Communications (shows include from T.A.T. Communications to ELP Communications), Four D Productions, Columbia TriStar Television and Sony Pictures Television. On some occasions, the company has distributed television titles not owned by Sony, such as Scholastic Productions' Animorphs, Rovio Entertainment's Angry Birds Toons, Angry Birds Stella and Piggy Tales, and The Jim Henson Company's Fraggle Rock and Emmet Otter's Jug-Band Christmas.

SPHE now distributes anime films or television shows or live-action Japanese/Asian films licensed by Funimation (now known as Crunchyroll, LLC) after their multi-year home video distribution service deal with Universal Pictures Home Entertainment (which was formed two years prior) expired.

In Canada, Columbia TriStar Home Video helped distribute tapes from Astral Video in the 1990s. It also has an Australian deal with Hoyts.

History

Early history
Sony Pictures Home Entertainment was established in June 1978 as Columbia Pictures Home Entertainment, and released  20 titles in November 1979. Its first 20 titles were licensed and distributed by Time-Life Video, a unit of Time-Life Films, but the relationship didn't last long, and Columbia formed its own distribution arm.

In March 1981, Columbia Pictures established a joint venture with RCA, RCA/Columbia Pictures International Video, to distribute tapes in overseas markets. The partnership expanded to North America as RCA/Columbia Pictures Home Video the following year. The venture distributed NBC titles, as it was a subsidiary of RCA at the time. When Tri-Star Pictures was formed in 1984, R/CPHV became one of the three primary distributors of Tri-Star product for home video (the other two being CBS/Fox Video and Thorn-EMI/HBO Video {later renamed to HBO/Cannon Video and then simply HBO Video}, as CBS and HBO originally held stakes in Tri-Star), and fully assumed distribution of TriStar titles in the early 1990s. In Australia, they signed a deal to distribute releases from Hoyts Distribution and formed a longstanding relationship in August 1983.

They also distributed titles from various other film companies unrelated to Columbia, including most of New Line Cinema's theatrical releases (though not all, as Media Home Entertainment and Family Home Entertainment distributed several New Line films during the Columbia deal). New Line formed their own video label in 1990 (the result of acquiring Nelson Entertainment, which had previously been Embassy Home Entertainment, itself a former Columbia subsidiary), but continued to go through RCA/Columbia Pictures (as well as SVS-Triumph and then Columbia TriStar Home Video) for distribution until 1994, when Turner Broadcasting acquired New Line and Turner Home Entertainment assumed distribution functions. In 1985, RCA/Columbia Pictures Home Video had signed a deal with Bellevue Home Entertainment to handle French-Canadian distribution of the product. 

On September 3, 1986, RCA/Columbia Pictures International Video had inked an agreement with Japanese studio Pony Canyon to distribute RCA/Columbia Pictures' product in Japan. On September 10, 1986, RCA/Columbia Pictures Home Video, via Magic Window, experimented with releasing second-season episodes of The Real Ghostbusters on videocassette early, ahead of the fall 1987 syndication debut, but behind the fall 1986 premiere on ABC. On October 29, 1986, RCA/Columbia Pictures Home Video decided to fire five staffers from the MusicVision video line, although the studio initially stated that the banner would remain as a "leading supplier for music videos". In early November 1987, the company's Australian arm, RCA/Columbia Pictures Hoyts Video, announced that it would halt all volume discounts, starting with the November releases of sucu successful Platoon and Mona Lisa.

In 1987, once the distribution deals has been expired, Tri-Star Pictures announced that it would be launching a home video unit Tri-Star Video, with Saul Melnick, a former MGM/UA Home Video employee, as its president. In 1988, after Coke sold its entertainment business, Tri-Star Video was merged into RCA/Columbia Pictures Home Video. In 1989, it was rumored that Trans World Entertainment would eventually sign a deal with RCA/Columbia to distribute its titles.

On February 18, 1987, RCA/Columbia Pictures International Video decided to launch a new regional organization, in order to reflect the label's expanded activities overseas, and created three regional operations, two in Europe, and one in the Far East, with Wolf-Dieter Gramite and Christian Paternot named vice president and regional directors for northern and southern Europe; Paternot retained his title as managing director of Gaumont/Columbia/RCA Video, and Richard H. Hansford was named director of human resources development. Michael R. Robinson was promoted to general manager of the label's UK operation. 

In March 1987, RCA/Columbia Pictures inked a three-film agreement with Crown International Pictures in which it would handle video distribution of Crown's in-house production Hunk, produced by Marimark, and Crown's acquired films Scorpion and Jocks; all three were released on video that summer.

In late May 1987, RCA/Columbia Pictures Home Video attempted to get a promotional boost for the summer campaign that would be touted on 65 million Coca-Cola paper cups and promotional pieces for Coke's "America's Summer Cup Game". Seven titles would be established through a companion "America's Summer Hit Sweepstakes" that The Coca-Cola Company, then the corporate parent of Columbia, would run primarily on radio stations owned by Westwood One. In late October 1987, RCA/Columbia Pictures International Video launched a new program supplier for its feature films. This supplier, the "Hit Revolving System", began in December with the release of the 1986 hit movie Platoon. The core of this campaign came from Nils Johnik, then the sales manager of the German division of RCA/Columbia Pictures International Video.

In March 1990, NBC filed a lawsuit against Columbia and its then-new parent company Sony under the perception that the latter two parties were violating their joint pact. Columbia purchased the foreign video rights to Orion Pictures titles a month earlier. NBC alleged that they were unaware of this transaction and had become convinced that Columbia was forming their own video unit in strict defiance of the joint venture, which was set to expire in 1992. Sony/Columbia denied NBC's claims. As the lawsuit continued into 1991, General Electric, the parent of NBC and RCA, announced that it was divesting its interest in RCA/Columbia. In August 1991, General Electric sold its 50% share of the company to Sony Corporation, and the litigation officially ended with Sony renaming the company as Columbia TriStar Home Video. In 1998, it inked a deal with The Jim Henson Company to launch its own video label, Jim Henson Home Entertainment, with CTHV distributing.

On February 28, 1999, CTHV and Universal Studios Home Video signed a multi-year deal to allow CTHV to distribute Universal's products on DVD outside North America.

It was named Columbia TriStar Home Entertainment from April 2001 until a name change to Sony Pictures Home Entertainment in November 2004.

SPHE had a three-year deal with Starz's Anchor Bay Entertainment for worldwide DVD releases, with the exceptions of North America, Canada, Australia, and the United Kingdom.

Metro-Goldwyn-Mayer
In 2005, when Sony and four partners acquired Metro-Goldwyn-Mayer (MGM) from Kirk Kerkorian, SPHE held the domestic home entertainment rights to MGM's 4,000 film and 10,400 television episode library, though the releases used the MGM DVD label. On May 31, 2006, MGM ended its distribution deal with SPHE and transferred most of its output to 20th Century Fox Home Entertainment.

In 2006, long time SPHE president Ben Feingold left the company and was replaced by MGM Home Entertainment executive Dave Bishop, who brought along numerous MGM employees to replace Sony staffers.

In February 2011, Sony regained full distribution rights to MGM Home Entertainment library under a deal that pays SPHE 8% in distribution fees (industry norm is 10%).

Recent history

On February 21, 2010, The Weinstein Company made a home video distribution deal with SPHE through Sony Pictures Worldwide Acquisitions. On August 31, 2010, SPHE partnered with Image Entertainment in a multi-year agreement, marketing and distributing DVDs and Blu-rays by Image. Image retains its own sales and marketing.

On April 23, 2012, Mill Creek announced that they had signed a home video distribution deal with SPHE, acquiring the rights to distribute 250 films from the Sony Pictures catalog on DVD and Blu-ray. On August 27, 2013, Mill Creek Entertainment signed a deal with SPHE to distribute 665 SPE films and 54 television series on DVD.

Anime News Network reported in February 2013 that Sony Pictures Home Entertainment's Australian joint venture with Universal Pictures Home Entertainment licensed anime television series from NBCUniversal Entertainment Japan for distribution in Australia, with its initial titles, A Certain Magical Index, Shakugan no Shana and Armitage III, scheduled for release on April 24, 2013. From 2017 to 2018, Funimation began directly distributing a select number of its anime titles in Australia and New Zealand through Sony Pictures Home Entertainment's Australian joint venture with Universal Pictures Home Entertainment. In September 2018, Funimation transferred distribution to Madman Entertainment, with Madman handling distribution and classification within the region.

On December 18, 2013, SPHE president David Bishop, who had served since 2006, announced he would leave when his contract expired in March 2014. It was announced that Man Jit Singh would replace Bishop.

On July 22, 2015, SPHE and Transmission Films reached a multi-year distribution pact to release Transmission's library in Australia (through Universal Sony Pictures Home Entertainment Australia Pty Limited) and in New Zealand. On November 20, 2015, SPHE announced that it would release Ultra HD Blu-ray releases.

On March 15, 2016, SPHE partnered with eOne to distribute films by Momentum Pictures across the globe except for Canada on physical and digital home entertainment platforms. In January 2017, SPHE expanded its distribution deal with Genius Brands to include all properties and acquired an equity stake in the company.

On February 6, 2018, Man Jit Singh stepped down as president of SPHE and was replaced by Keith LeGoy.

In February 2021, Sony announced it would distribute releases by Lionsgate Home Entertainment in North America beginning in July 2021, when Lionsgate's distribution deal with 20th Century Studios Home Entertainment expires.

Sub-labels

During this time, the company also has and had some sub-labels, including:
 Magic Window – Children's titles (including He-Man and the Masters of the Universe and The Real Ghostbusters, as well as classic Columbia/UPA cartoons).
 RCA-Columbia Pictures International Video – International films (some of these were released by CEL in Australia).
 SVS-Triumph – Some low-profile Columbia, TriStar, New Line, CineTel Films and Epic Productions releases, and releases from Triumph Films (it was founded in 1979 as Sony Video Services, then Sony Video Software, which spawned a global worldwide distribution deal with Warner Home Video in Netherlands by 1987, and renamed after the formation of Sony Pictures Entertainment, to be used briefly in-between the ending of the RCA joint venture and the formation of Columbia-TriStar).
 Musicvision – A short-lived music video division of RCA/Columbia Pictures HV in the mid-1980s.
 Columbia Classics – A label releasing classic films on DVD by Columbia Pictures; it was previously used for VHS and LaserDisc releases as well.
 Screen Classics by Request- A service available on the web, where classic films are pressed and ordered directly from Sony, similar to Warner Bros.' "Warner Archive" brand. A similar service called "Choice Collection" also exists, but is pressed and ordered directly from Warner, via the systems used for the "Warner Archive" titles.
 Superbit

International sub-labels
 Gaumont-Columbia-RCA Video – A French home video label that released films by Gaumont, Columbia Pictures, TriStar, and Triumph Films originally formed in 1982. It was later renamed as Gaumont/RCA/Columbia Pictures Home Video in 1986 and Gaumont-Columbia TriStar Home Video in 1992.
 RCA/Columbia Pictures/Hoyts Video Pty. Ltd. – An Australian home video label that released films by Hoyts Distribution, Cannon Films, Columbia Pictures, TriStar and Triumph Films originally formed in August 1983.
First Release Home Entertainment – A mixture of B-movies, Magic Window, music videos, TriStar, top TV shows, re-releases, Thames Video and some mainstream Hoyts/Columbia/Cannon/Triumph/other film releases in Australia and The Netherlands.
Video Box Office – a mixture of B-movies, HBO and some mainstream releases in Australia.
 20/20 Vision – A British rental home video label that released films by TriStar Pictures, Goldcrest Films International, New Line Cinema, Triumph Films and Columbia Pictures.
 VideoServis – A Russian home video label with Walt Disney Studios Home Entertainment that released films by Columbia Pictures, Monumental Pictures, TriStar and Screen Gems, created in 1994. After VideoServis sold Sony to CP Distribution (through Warner Home Video) in August 2014.
 France Télévisions Home Entertainment – A French joint-venture with France Télévisions, made for distributing DVD releases from France TV channels shows and movies, since when was named Columbia TriStar Home Entertainment, Sony distributes France TV DVDs.
 Sony Pictures Home Entertainment Distribution UK Ltd. – A British home video label that distributes Fox Pathé Home Entertainment (including MGM Home Entertainment releases) and Universal Studios Home Entertainment  (including DreamWorks Home Entertainment and PolyGram Video releases).
 Delta Pictures is an Italian Home video distributor 
 First Independent Films – a British film distributor and home video company that replaced Vestron Video International's UK operations. HTV, the ITV franchise holder for Wales and the West of England, acquired Vestron UK in May 1990 and renamed the company to First Independent Films. Then Later, First Independent Films was sold to Columbia TriStar Home Video (now Sony Pictures Home Entertainment) and the label was folded into Columbia TriStar in 1999. However, Columbia TriStar continued to use the First Independent Films label for some years afterwards.

During the time that Consolidated Press Holdings, and later Publishing and Broadcasting Limited and West Australian Newspapers owned Hoyts, they re-established the Hoyts Distribution arm of the company. SPHE Australia releases Hoyts titles, including the recent box-office hit, Twilight. They also released the handful of films from the Nine Network's film arm, Nine Films and Television.

SPHE also handles the Australian DVD distribution of Lionsgate titles (via Hoyts), after that company was unsuccessful in purchasing Magna Pacific, and the subsequent collapse of the successful bidder, Destra Entertainment.

References

External links
 

Home video distributors
Home video companies of the United States
Home Entertainment
Entertainment companies based in California
Companies based in Culver City, California
Entertainment companies established in 1978
1978 establishments in California
Former General Electric subsidiaries
Sony Pictures Entertainment Motion Picture Group